The 1937 Buckingham by-election was a by-election held on 11 June 1937 for the British House of Commons constituency of Buckingham in Buckinghamshire.

Vacancy
The by-election was caused by the elevation to peerage of the town's Conservative Party Member of Parliament (MP) George Bowyer, who was ennobled as Baron Denham.

Candidates
The Liberal Party selected Edwin James Boyce. He had been headmaster at Wolverton County Secondary School. He had been Chairman of the constituency Liberal association and had been elected as the association's President. He was an executive member of the Home Counties Liberal Federation.

Result 
The result was a victory for the Conservative candidate John Whiteley, who was elected with a majority of over 5,000 votes.  Whiteley died in office six years later, triggering another by-election.

See also 
 List of United Kingdom by-elections
 Buckingham constituency
 1943 Buckingham by-election

References

Bibliography
 

1937 elections in the United Kingdom
1937 in England
20th century in Buckinghamshire
By-elections to the Parliament of the United Kingdom in Buckinghamshire constituencies
Buckingham